"Modern Way" is the fourth and final single released from English indie rock band Kaiser Chiefs' 2005 debut album, Employment, on 7 November 2005. It entered the UK Singles Chart at  11 and became a minor hit in Ireland and the Netherlands.

Music video
The song's music video marked the directorial debut of the band's lead singer, Ricky Wilson and was co-directed by prolific video director Scott Lyon. It tells of the success of William Green, a juggler who has a unique skill for balancing tennis balls on his face, and the impact that he has made on the public. The band appears throughout as extras, notably donning glasses and facial hair, but during Green's climatic performance, they appear as themselves.

Track listings
UK CD1
 "Modern Way" – 3:31
 "People Need Light" – 3:06

UK CD2
 "Modern Way" – 3:31
 "Moon" – 2:51
 "It Ain't Easy" (demo) – 2:25
 "Modern Way" (video)

UK 7-inch single
A. "Modern Way" – 3:31
B. "Run Again" – 2:40

Charts

References

2004 songs
2005 singles
Kaiser Chiefs songs
Song recordings produced by Stephen Street
Songs written by Andrew White (musician)
Songs written by Nick "Peanut" Baines
Songs written by Nick Hodgson
Songs written by Ricky Wilson (British musician)
Songs written by Simon Rix